Senia or Sénia may refer to:

Places
 Senia (Ancient Rome), ancient name of the town of Senj, Croatia
 Es Sénia (formerly La Sénia), a commune in Algeria
 La Sénia, a municipality in Catalonia, Spain
 Sénia River, in Castellón and Tarragona provinces, Spain

Companies and brands
 Senia (marque), a Chinese automotive brand owned by FAW Jilin that produces passenger vehicles.

Other uses
 Senia gharana, a sitar gharana (Hindustani musical tradition)